Willys Theatre Presenting Ben Hecht's Tales of the City is a live US half-hour television anthology series. It consisted of adaptations of author Ben Hecht's stories. Hecht served as the series host. A total of seven episodes aired from June 25, 1953, to September 17, 1953, on CBS, alternating weekly with Four Star Playhouse.

The program is also known as Tales of the City.

Among its guest stars were Gary Merrill, Madeleine Carroll, Charles Coburn, Laraine Day Wendell Corey, Hume Cronyn, and Ann Rutherford.

References

External links

1950s American anthology television series
1953 American television series debuts
1953 American television series endings
CBS original programming